The 1989–90 DFB-Pokal was the 47th season of the annual German football cup competition. It began on 19 August 1989 and ended on 19 May 1990. 64 teams competed in the tournament of six rounds. In the final 1. FC Kaiserslautern defeated Werder Bremen 3–2.

Matches

First round

Replays

Second round

Round of 16

Quarter-finals

Replay

Semi-finals

Final

References

External links
 Official site of the DFB 
 Kicker.de 

1989-90
1989–90 in German football cups